Come rubammo la bomba atomica or How We Stole the Atomic Bomb is a 1967 Italian-Egyptian international co-production Eurospy comedy based on the 1966 Palomares B-52 crash. Filmed in Italy and Egypt, it stars the Italian comic duo of Franco and Ciccio and was directed by Lucio Fulci. The film features a teaming of parodies of famous film secret agents.

Plot
Italian fisherman Franco and his father are fishing off the coast of Egypt when they see an American Air Force bomber crash in the water carrying nuclear weapons.  Franco's father and the rest of the crew flee in a lifeboat, stranding Franco in the boat off the coast, which soon beaches. When Franco swims ashore, Agent 87, a member of an international criminal organization called SPECTRALIS, kidnaps him to locate the nuclear weapon. A shadowy man named Pasqualino (aka: Number One) leads SPECTRALIS. Pasqualino sends a local Egyptian scientist and SPECTRALIS employee named Dr. Yes, who wishes to use the energy of the atomic weapon to reanimate Egyptian mummies.

Ciccio cannot extract information from the buffoonish fisherman for the atomic bomb's location. His attempt to threaten Franco with torture on a mechanical butt-kicking device backfires when Ciccio lets himself demonstrate the necessary posture himself.

Franco escapes and arrives at a local train station. Too dim-witted to understand that he's in Egypt, he attempts to purchase a railway ticket back to his home in Palermo. But the language barrier is an obstacle as Franco cannot speak any Arabic. However, an Italian priest in line at the window helps him out by explaining where he is, and Franco treats the man to a cappuccino at the station bar. As Franco explains his predicament in detail to the bewildered priest, his hollering voice attracts the attention of a beautiful woman named Cinzia, who joins in on the conversation.

Back at the SPECTRALLIS base in Egypt, three persistent but inept spies named James Bomb, Modesty Bluff, and Derek Flit attack Ciccio. However, they are so fixated on depriving each other of the catch then let him escape unnoticed while they brawl it out.

Meanwhile, Cinzia has lured Franco back to her hotel room with the promise of an erotic liaison. Unknown to Franco, she is an agent for Dr. Yes. However, while she has her back turned, Bomb, Bluff, and Flit break into the room and attempt to abduct Franco, with the same hilarious results as before. Then Ciccio arrives, grabs his prisoner back, and spirits him away to the base. This time, Ciccio uses a lie detector to probe Franco's mind by asking him questions about the atomic bomb. Seeing that Franco knows nothing, Ciccio confides in him that his superiors will have him killed for failure to find the missing bomb. Franco talks Ciccio into teaming up in hatching a plot to plant a fake atomic bomb where it can be found.

Franco and Ciccio make contact with Cinzia, who believes their claims that they have found the missing bomb. She tricks them into a meeting with Dr. Yes at his underground headquarters at a large villa outside Cairo. Franco and Ciccio learn that Dr. Yes plans to revive an Egyptian mummy of Nabuco Sonor, the Queen of the Dead. He requires the atomic bomb's radiation to achieve her reanimation. His experiment appears to be successful when he achieves a thumb twitch from a specimen. Franco and Ciccio deliver the fake bomb, only to be told they will be sacrificed to the Queen of the Dead on her revival. The duo laughs, knowing that the bomb is not real. But their hilarity turns to terror when the mummy stands up and advances towards them. But Dr. Yes' plans are thwarted when the "mummy" is revealed to be Derek Flit in disguise. With the aid of Bomb and Bluff, Flit attack and beats up all of Dr. Yes' men and then abduct Franco and Ciccio.

Back out in the desert, the three inept spies fall out again over who will get the credit for turning them over to their superiors. They stop fighting each other when a live report on their car radio announces that the nations involved have given up the search for America has claimed that there was no nuclear bomb actually on board the plane that crashed. Franco takes the disgraced Ciccio aboard his fishing boat still beached on the shore to sail back to Italy. When they pull up the fishing nets to cast off, they discover the actual atomic bomb tangled in the boat's fishing nets.

In the final scene set a few weeks later, Franco and Ciccio are aboard a yacht living in the life of luxury, with the atomic bomb pointed across the sea as they are blackmailing world leaders for untold riches by telephone to avert nuclear destruction.

Cast
Franco Franchi as  Franco 
Ciccio Ingrassia  as  Ciccio number 87 Spectrales
 Julie Ménard as  Cinzia 
 Eugenia Litrel as  Modesty Bluff 
Youssef Wahbi  as Doctor Yes
Adel Adham as  James Bomb 
Bonvi as  Derek Flit 
 Gianfranco Morici as   Dr. Yes's Assistant
 Enzo Andronico as number 1221 Spectrales
 Alessandro Tedeschi as number 3 Spectrales
 Lucio Fulci as Pasqualino number 1 Spectrales

Notes

External links
 

1967 films
Films about nuclear war and weapons
Films directed by Lucio Fulci
1960s Italian-language films
Italian buddy comedy films
Italian parody films
1960s spy comedy films
1960s buddy comedy films
1960s parody films
Italian spy comedy films
1967 comedy films
1960s Italian films